Bitch Ass is a 2022 American crime horror film directed by Bill Posley and starring Tony Todd.  It is Posley’s feature directorial debut.

Plot

Cast
Tony Todd as Titus Darq
Sheaun McKinney as Spade
Tunde Laleye as Bitch Ass
Me'lisa Sellers as Marsia Gatson
Teon Kelley as Quentin 
A-F-R-O as Moo
Kelsey Caesar as Tuck
Belle Guillory as Cricket
Jarvis Denman Jr. as Young Cecil
Tim J. Smith as Bootz

Production
According to Posley, Clarence Williams III was considered for the role portrayed by Todd.

Release
The film premiered on March 14, 2022 at South by Southwest.  The film was also shown at the Chattanooga Film Festival in June 2022.

It was announced in June 2022, that Quiver Distribution acquired North American rights to the film, which was released on October 14, 2022.

Reception

Carlos Aguilar of IndieWire graded the film a B- and wrote, "Invoking an oft-overlooked canon, actor turned director Bill Posley fabricates a highly entertaining homage to the Black horror of decades past with Bitch Ass..."

Valerie Complex of Deadline Hollywood gave the film a positive review, calling it "a funny, charming piece of B-horror cinema that has what it takes to stand firm among the many B-movie cult classics."

Nick Allen of RogerEbert.com gave the film a negative review and wrote, "There's just not enough imagination or tact to make this all unsettling or fun, even though a serial killer named Bitch Ass is a good hook."

Meagan Navarro of Bloody Disgusting and Mary Beth McAndrews of Dread Central both awarded the film a three out of five score.

References

External links
 
 

2022 films
2022 crime films
2022 directorial debut films
2022 horror films
2020s English-language films
American crime films
American horror films
Crime horror films
Quiver Distribution films
2020s American films